The Māori people and Moriori people have 773 tribal marae (meeting grounds) around New Zealand. These grounds usually include a wharenui (meeting house) and are usually affiliated with iwi (tribes) and hapū (sub-tribes).

Like the related institutions of old Polynesia, the marae is a wāhi tapu, a 'sacred place' which carries great cultural meaning.

This area is used for pōwhiri (welcome ceremonies) featuring oratory. The wharenui is the locale for important meetings, sleepovers, and craft and other cultural activities.

The wharekai (dining hall) is used primarily for communal meals, but other activities may be carried out there.

Marae by region

North Island
List of marae in the Auckland Region
List of marae in the Bay of Plenty Region
List of marae in the Gisborne District
List of marae in the Hawke's Bay Region
List of marae in the Manawatu-Wanganui Region
List of marae in the Northland Region
List of marae in the Taranaki Region
List of marae in the Waikato Region
List of marae in the Wellington Region

South Island and other islands
List of marae in the Canterbury Region
List of marae in the Chatham Islands
List of marae in the Marlborough Region
List of marae in Nelson, New Zealand
List of marae in the Otago Region
List of marae in the Southland Region
List of marae in the Tasman Region
List of marae in the West Coast Region

See also 
 List of iwi
 List of Māori waka
 Lists of schools in New Zealand

References